Hlynsk is a village of Romny Raion, Sumy Oblast. The village is administered by its own rural council. The population is about 1.5 thousand. The settlement is known for its ties with Mamai descendants and representatives of the Glinski family. Until the 19th century it was a city with its own rathaus.

Geography
The village is located on the banks of the Sula River which is a tributary of the Dnieper River. The village is located between two hydrological zakazniks (preserves), Andryashivka-Hudyma (established in 1977) and Bilovoda (established in 1980).

Historical landmarks
 St Nicholas church (built in 1790s by Sotnik Kryzhanovsky) revived in 1989
 Ruins of a fortress

External links
 Hlynsk on The History of Cities and Villages of the Ukrainian SSR
 Profile at the Verkhovna Rada website
 St.Nicholas Church website

Villages in Romny Raion
Romensky Uyezd